Turnera is a genus of flowering plants in the passionflower family, Passifloraceae. It contains more than 100 species native to tropical and subtropical America. The name honours English naturalist William Turner (1508–1568). It was previously placed in the family Turneraceae.

Species
The following species are currently recognized:

A 

 Turnera acangatinga Costa-Lima & E.C.O.Chagas
 Turnera acaulis1Griseb.
 Turnera acuta2 Willd.
 Turnera amapaensis R.S.Cowan
 Turnera amazonica1?Arbo
 Turnera angelicae Arbo
 Turnera annectens2 Arbo
 Turnera arcuata2 Urb.
 Turnera arenaria (Spruce ex Urb.) Arbo
 Turnera argentea2 Arbo
 Turnera aromatica2Arbo
 Turnera asymmetrica2Arbo
 Turnera aurantiaca2 Benth.
 Turnera aurelioi1 Arbo

B 

 Turnera bahiensis Urb.
 var. bahiensis2 
 var. truncata2 Arbo.
 Turnera benthamiana2 M.R.Schomb.
 Turnera blanchetiana Urb.
 var. blanchetiana2
 var. subsppicata Urb.
 Turnera brasiliensis2Willd. ex Schult.
 Turnera breviflora2Moura

C 

 Turnera caatingana2 Arbo
 Turnera callosa2 Urb.
 Turnera campaniflora1 Arbo, Shore & S.C.H.Barrett
 Turnera candida1 Arbo
 Turnera castilloi2 Arbo
 Turnera cearensis2 Urb.
 Turnera chamaedrifolia3 Cambess.
 Turnera chrysocephala2Urb.
 Turnera cicatricosa2 Arbo
 Turnera cipoensis2Arbo
 Turnera clauseniana2 Urb.
 Turnera coccinea2 Arbo
 Turnera coerulea2 DC.
 var. coerulea2
 var. surinamensis2 (Urb.) Arbo & Av.Fernández
 Turnera collotricha2 Arbo
 Turnera concinna2 Arbo
 Turnera confertiflora2 Arbo
 Turnera coriacea Urb.
 var.  solium2
 Turnera crulsii2 Urb.
 Turnera cuneiformis1 Juss. ex Poir.
 Turnera curassavica2 Urb.

D 

 Turnera dasytricha Pilg.
 var. crinita Arbo
 var. dasytricha
 Turnera diamantinae Arbo
 Turnera dichotoma2 Gardner ex Hook.
 Turnera diffusa Willd. ex Schult.
 var. diffusa2
 Turnera discolor2 Urb.
 Turnera discors Arbo
 Turnera dolichostigma2Urb.

E 

 Turnera elliptica2 Urb.
 Turnera emendata Arbo

F 

 Turnera fasciculifolia L.Rocha & Arbo
 Turnera fernandezii2Arbo
 Turnera fissifolia Arbo
 Turnera foliosa2 Urb.

G 

 Turnera gardneriana1? Arbo
 Turnera genistoides2 Cambess.
 Turnera glabrata Arbo
 Turnera glaziovii2 Urb.
 Turnera gouveiana Arbo
 Turnera grandidentata2 (Urb.) Arbo
 Turnera grandiflora2 (Urb.) Arbo
 Turnera guianensis2 Aubl.

H 

 Turnera harleyi2 Arbo
 Turnera hassleriana2 Urb.
 Turnera hermannioides2 Cambess.
 Turnera hilaireana2 Urb.
 Turnera hindsiana2 Benth.
 subspecies brachyantha2 Arbo
 subspecies hindsiana2
 Turnera huberi2 Arbo
 Turnera humilis Arbo

I 

 Turnera ibateguara Costa-Lima & E.C.O.Chagas
 Turnera ignota2 Arbo
 Turnera incana2 Cambess.
 Turnera involucrata2 Arbo
 Turnera iterata2 Arbo

J 

 Turnera jobertii Arbo
 Turnera joelii2 Arbo

K 

 Turnera krapovickasii2 Arbo
 Turnera kuhlmanniana2 Arbo

L 

 Turnera laciniata2 Arbo
 Turnera lamiifolia2 Cambess.
 Turnera lanceolata2 Cambess.
 Turnera leptosperma2 Urb.
 Turnera lineata2? Urb.
 Turnera longiflora2 Cambess.
 Turnera longipes2 Triana ex Urb.
 Turnera lucida1 Urb.
 Turnera luetzelburgii Sleumer
 var. dubia2 Arbo
 var. luetzelburgii2

M 

 Turnera macrophylla3 Urb.
 Turnera macrosperma L.Rocha & Arbo
 Turnera maigualidensis J.R.Grande & Arbo
 Turnera melanorhiza2 Urb.
 var. arenaria2
 var. latifolia2
 var. melochioides2
 var. rugosa2
 Turnera melochia Triana & Planch.
 var. melochia 
 var. ramosissima (Spruce ex Urb.) Arbo
 Turnera melochioides Cambess.
 var. latifolia Urb.
 var. melochioides 2
 var. rugosa Arbo

N 

 Turnera nervosa2 Urb.

O 

 Turnera oblongifolia2 Cambess.
 var. goyanzensis2 (Urb.) Arbo
 var. oblongifolia2
 Turnera occidentalis1 Arbo & Shore
 Turnera oculata Story
 var. oculata1
 var. paucipilosa (Oberm.)
 Turnera odorata2 Rich.
 Turnera opifera2 Mart.
 Turnera orientalis1 (Urb.) Arbo

P 

 Turnera panamensis2Urb 
 Turnera paradoxa Arbo
 Turnera paruana2 Arbo
 Turnera patens Arbo
 Turnera pinifolia1 Cambess.
 Turnera pohliana2 Urb.
 Turnera prancei2 Arbo
 Turnera pumilea L.
 var. piauhyensis2 Urb.
 var. pumilea1
 Turnera purpurascens2 Arbo

R 

 Turnera reginae2 Arbo
 Turnera revoluta2 Urb.
 Turnera riedeliana2 Urb.
 Turnera rosulata2 Arbo
 Turnera rupestris Aubl.
 var. frutescemces (Aubl.) Urb.
 var. rupestris2

S 

 Turnera sancta2 Arbo
 Turnera scabra2 Millsp.
 Turnera serrata Vell.
 var. brevifolia2 Urb.
 var. latifolia Urb.
 var. serrata 2
 Turnera sidoides L.
 subsp. carnea3 (Cambess.) Arbo
 subsp. holosericea3 (Urb.) Arbo
 subsp. integrifolia2 (Griseb.) Arbo
 subsp. pinnatifida2 (Juss. ex Poir.) Arbo
 subsp. sidoides3
 Turnera simulans2 Arbo
 Turnera stachydifolia Urb. & Rolfe
 var. flexuosa Urb.
 var. stachydifolia2
 Turnera stenophylla2 Urb.
 Turnera steyermarkii2 Arbo
 Turnera stipularis2 Urb.
 Turnera subnuda2 Urb.
 Turnera subulata2 Sm.

T 

 Turnera tapajoensis1?Moura
 Turnera tenuicaulis2 Urb.
 Turnera thomasii1 (Urb.) Story
 Turnera triglandulosa Millsp.
 Turnera trigona2 Urb.

U 

 Turnera uleana2 Urb.
 Turnera ulmifolia1 L.
 var. acuta1 (Mill.) Willd.
 var. ulmifolia1
 Turnera urbanii1 Arbo

V 

 Turnera vallisii Arbo
 Turnera velutina1 C.Presl
 Turnera venezuelana Arbo
 Turnera venosa2 Urb.
 Turnera vicaria2 Arbo
 Turnera violacea Brandegee

W 

 Turnera weddelliana2 Urb. & Rolfe

Z 

 Turnera zeasperma C.D.Adams & V.Bean

Notes on the number of floral morphs 
1,2,3 denote the number of floral morphs (1 = homostylous, 2 = distylous, 3 = distylous with intermediate morph) ? Denotes uncertain annotations. Those unannotated are missing data.

Formerly placed in the genus 
Piriqueta cistoides (L.) Griseb. (as T. cistoides L. or T. tomentosa Willd.)
Piriqueta racemosa (Jacq.) Sweet (as T. ovata Bello or T. racemosa Jacq.)

References

External links
USDA PLANTS Profile

 
Malpighiales genera
Taxonomy articles created by Polbot